The 2017 Roscommon Senior Football Championship is the 117th edition of Roscommon GAA's premier Gaelic football tournament for senior graded clubs in County Roscommon, Ireland. The tournament consists of 12 teams, with the winner representing Roscommon in the Connacht Senior Club Football Championship.

The championship starts with a seeded group stage and then progresses to a knock out stage.

St. Brigid's were the defending champions after they defeated Pádraig Pearse's in the previous years final, and they successfully defended their title to claim a "2-in-a-row" of championships and their 16th overall when defeating Roscommon Gaels 3-13 to 3-7 in the final at Dr. Hyde Park.

Kilmore bounced straight back to the top flight for this season from the Intermediate ranks after relegation in 2015, through claiming the 2016 I.F.C. title. However, they were relegated back to the middle tier for 2018 after losing the Relegation Final to Castlerea St. Kevin's.

Team changes 

The following teams have changed division since the 2016 championship season.

To S.F.C. 
Promoted from 2016 Roscommon Intermediate Football Championship
 Kilmore – (Intermediate Champions)

From S.F.C. 
Relegated to 2017 Roscommon Intermediate Football Championship
 Michael Glavey's

Group stage 
All 12 teams enter the competition at this stage.

The competition split into two groups, based on their performance in the 2016 Group stages. Group 1 consists of teams who reached the quarter-finals last year or better. Group 2 consists of two bottom placed finishers in Group 1 last year as well as 3rd and 4th placed in Group 2 last year, the 2016 Relegation Playoff winners and the 2016 Intermediate champions.

The top 2 teams in Group 1 go into the semi-finals, where they await the winners of the quarter-finals, which are composed of the 3rd and 4th placed teams in Group 1 along with the top 2 finishers in Group 2. The bottom 2 teams in Group 2 will enter a Relegation Playoff.

Group 1

Group 1 Table

Group 1 Round 1

Group 1 Round 2

Group 1 Round 3

Group 1 Round 4

Group 1 Round 5

Group 2

Group 2 Table

Group 2 Round 1

Group 2 Round 2

Group 2 Round 3

Group 2 Round 4

Group 2 Round 5

Knock-Out Stages

Relegation Final 

 Castlerea St. Kevin's 1-11, 0-7 Kilmore, Boyle, 10/9/2017,

Finals

Quarter-finals

Semi-finals

Final

Connacht Senior Club Football Championship

Championship statistics

Miscellaneous
 Roscommon Gaels qualify for the final for the first time since 2004.

References 

Roscommon Senior Football Championship
Roscommon Senior Football Championship